The Subway Gallery was a contemporary art gallery in the West End of London, England. It is now permanently closed.

The gallery was established on 6 June 2006 by the artist Robert Gordon McHarg III in a 1960s kiosk with glass walls. It is located at 1 Edgware Road Subway on Edgware Road in Bayswater, in a tube station subway. 

In March 2011, the London-based graffiti artist Stik had a solo show at the gallery. The American photograph Bob Gruen has also exhibited there.

References

External links
 Subway Gallery website

2006 establishments in England
Art galleries established in 2006
Defunct art galleries in London
Buildings and structures in the City of Westminster
Contemporary art galleries in London